Lethe sinorix, the tailed red forester, is a species of Satyrinae butterfly found in the  Indomalayan realm

Subspecies
L. s. sinorix Sikkim, Bhutan, Assam, Burma, Thailand
L. s. vanda    Corbet, 1941   Peninsular Malaya (Cameron Highlands)
L. s. obscura    Mell, 1942

References

sinorix
Butterflies of Asia
Butterflies of Indochina